NGC 5189 (Gum 47, IC 4274, nicknamed Spiral Planetary Nebula) is a planetary nebula in the constellation Musca. It was discovered by James Dunlop on 1 July 1826, who catalogued it as Δ252. For many years, well into the 1960s, it was thought to be a bright emission nebula. It was  Karl Gordon Henize in 1967 who first described NGC 5189 as quasi-planetary based on its spectral emissions.

Seen through the telescope it seems to have an S shape, reminiscent of a barred spiral galaxy. The S shape, together with point-symmetric knots in the nebula, have for a long time hinted to astronomers that a binary central star is present. 
The Hubble Space Telescope imaging analysis showed that this S shape structure is indeed two dense low-ionization regions: one moving toward the north-east and another one moving toward the south-west of the nebula, which could be a result of a recent outburst from the central star. Observations with the Southern African Large Telescope have finally found a white dwarf companion in a 4.04 day orbit around the rare low-mass Wolf-Rayet type central star of NGC 5189. NGC 5189 is estimated to be 546 parsecs or 1,780 light years away from Earth. Other measurements have yielded results up to 900 parsecs (~3000 light-years).

References

External links

A Cosmic Holiday Ornament, Hubble-Style
Southern African Large Telescope: Elusive Binary System

Musca (constellation)
5189
Planetary nebulae
18260701
IC objects
Discoveries by James Dunlop